Flight 980 may refer to

ALM Flight 980, ditched on 2 May 1970
Eastern Air Lines Flight 980, crashed on 1 January 1985

0980